Restland Memorial Park is a cemetery located in an unincorporated area of Dallas County, Texas between Dallas and Richardson. It is the final resting place of many prominent figures in the Dallas area, including politicians and professional athletes.

It is located on 13005 Greenville Avenue, Dallas, Texas  75243 North of I635 at Hwy 75, near Richland College.

Notable burials 
 Heinz Becker – first baseman for the Chicago Cubs and Cleveland Indians in the 1940s
 William Arvis Blakley – former U.S. senator from Texas
 Bill Boyd – actor and C&W musician
 David Browning – Olympic diver
 Earle Cabell – former mayor of Dallas, U.S. Representative
 Tom Campbell Clark  – US Supreme Court Justice
 James Mitchell Collins  – former United States Representative for the 3rd Congressional District of Texas (1968–1983)
 Patrick Cranshaw – actor

 Mike Gaechter – defensive back for the Dallas Cowboys in the 1960s
 Salvador Gliatto – MLB pitcher
 Ed Gossett – US Congressman
 Jerry Gray – arranger, composer, and conductor
 Willie Hutch – singer and songwriter
 Hattie Leah Henenberg – lawyer, member of the All-Woman Supreme Court of 1925
 Sam Johnson – former United States Representative for the 3rd Congressional District of Texas (1991–2019)
 Nathalie Krassovska – dancer for Ballet Russe de Monte-Carlo and Director for Krassovska Ballet Jeunesse, Dallas
 Frank Lane – MLB executive
 Conrad Lau – aeronautical engineer, inventor, executive
 Herman Lay – businessman
 Jim Levey – early 1930s Major League shortstop
 Bronko Lubich – wrestler and referee
 Harvey Martin – defensive end for the Dallas Cowboys in the 1970s and 1980s
 Jerry Mays – football defensive tackle
 Norm McRae – BLP pitcher
 Justin Mentell – artist and actor

 Ray Morehart – MLB infielder
 Ray Price – country-pop singer
 Jethro Pugh – football pro tackle
 Steve Ramsey – football quarterback
 Russell A. Steindam – Medal of Honor recipient
 Tex Schramm – NFL executive
 Russell A. Steindam – US Army officer and Medal of Honor recipient
 Robert L. Thornton – businessman and Mayor of Dallas
 Ron Woodroof – AIDS victim and creator of The Dallas Buyers Club

References

External links
 
 
 The Political Graveyard, Dallas County, Tex.
  

Cemeteries in Dallas